Funvic/Soul Brasil Pro Cycling is a UCI Professional Continental men's cycling team based in Brazil. The team was founded in 2010.

Doping
On August 12, 2016 the UCI announced that Kléber Ramos had tested positive for CERA on 31 July 2016. Ramos had competed in the Olympic Games road race. On November 17 the UCI announced Ramiro Rincon Diaz and João Gaspar has also tested positive for CERA. These positive tests constituted the team's second and third AAFs within a twelve-month period and as a result, the UCI moved to suspend the team under Anti Doping Rule, article 7.12, Suspension of a Team Registered with the UCI. In December 2016, the team was suspended for 55 days, due to the three doping positives within a 12-month period.

In March 2017 Brazilian rider Alex Correia Diniz was provisionally suspended due to an adverse biological passport finding, with fellow Brazilian Otavio Bulgarelli being provisionally suspended for "tampering". With the team's previous ban expiring on February 12, the team now faces a potential ban of between 15 days to 12 months. In May, the team were banned for a second time for 35 days from 15 July to 19 August.

Team roster

Major wins

2010
Stages 5 & 9 Vuelta del Uruguay, Roberto Pinheiro
Stages 6 & 7a Vuelta del Uruguay, Héctor Aguilar
Stage 7b Vuelta del Uruguay, Pedro Autran Nicacio
Stages 4 & 5 Volta de Gravataí, Roberto Pinheiro
Stage 1 Tour de Santa Catarina, José Eriberto Silva
Stage 3 Tour de Santa Catarina, Edgardo Simón
 Overall Volta do Paraná, Marco Arriagada
Stages 1 & 3, Marco Arriagada
Stages 1 & 7 Volta de São Paulo, Edgardo Simón
Stage 2 Volta de São Paulo, Héctor Aguilar
Stage 3 Volta de São Paulo, Flávio Cardoso
Stage 4a Volta de São Paulo, Magno Nazaret
2011
 Time Trial Championships, Magno Nazaret
Stage 7 Tour de San Luis, Héctor Aguilar
Stage 6 Rutas de América, Héctor Aguilar
Prologue & Stage 1 Giro do Interior de São Paulo, Flávio Cardoso
Stage 2 Volta de Gravataí, Antônio Nascimento
Stage 4 Volta de Gravataí, Roberto Pinheiro
Stage 4 Tour do Rio, Magno Nazaret
Stage 1 Volta de São Paulo, Antônio Nascimento
Stage 3 Volta de São Paulo, Flávio Cardoso
Stage 4 Volta de São Paulo, Roberto Pinheiro
2012
 Road Race Championships, Otávio Bulgarelli
Pan American Time Trial Championships, Magno Nazaret
Stage 1 Vuelta Mexico Telmex, Héctor Aguilar
 Overall Vuelta del Uruguay, Magno Nazaret
Stage 3, Héctor Aguilar
Stage 8 (ITT), Magno Nazaret
Stage 2 Vuelta a Guatemala, Gregolry Panizo
Stage 5 Tour do Rio, Roberto Pinheiro
 Overall Tour do Brasil, Magno Nazaret
Stage 3 (ITT), Magno Nazaret
2013
Copa América de Ciclismo, Francisco Chamorro
Stage 3 Tour de San Luis, Alex Diniz
Stage 5 Tour do Rio, Gregolry Panizo
2014
 Road Race Championships, Antonio Garnero
 Time Trial Championships, Pedro Autran Nicacio
 Overall Tour do Brasil, Magno Nazaret
Stage 1, Flávio Cardoso
Stage 2, Juan Sebastián Tamayo
Stages 3 & 4 (ITT), Magno Nazaret
Stage 2 Volta do Rio Grande do Sul, Óscar Sánchez
 Overall Volta do Paraná, Carlos Manarelli
Stages 2 & 3, Carlos Manarelli
2015
 Overall Tour de San Luis, Daniel Díaz
Stages 2 & 4, Daniel Díaz
Stage 6, Kléber Ramos
Stages 2, 3, 6 & 8 Vuelta del Uruguay, Francisco Chamorro
Stage 1 Volta Ciclística Internacional do Rio Grande do Sul, Roberto Pinheiro
Stage 3 Volta do Paraná, Flávio Cardoso
 Time Trial Championships, Magno Nazaret
Copa América de Ciclismo, Carlos Manarelli
2016
 Overall Volta Ciclística Internacional do Rio Grande do Sul, Murilo Affonso
Stage 1, Murilo Affonso
 Road Race Championships, Flávio Cardoso
2017
Overall Vuelta del Uruguay, Magno Nazaret
Stage 3b, Team time trial
Stage 6 (ITT), Magno Nazaret
 Time Trial Championships, Magno Nazaret
2018
Overall Vuelta del Uruguay, Magno Nazaret
Stage 2a, Team time trial
Stage 8a (ITT), Magno Nazaret

National champions

2011
 Brazilian Time Trial Championship, Magno Nazaret
2012
 Brazilian Road Race Championship, Otávio Bulgarelli
2014
 Brazilian Road Race Championship, Antonio Garnero
 Brazilian Time Trial Championship, Pedro Autran Nicacio
2015
 Brazilian Time Trial Championship, Magno Nazaret
2016
 Brazilian Road Race Championship, Flávio Cardoso
2017
 Brazilian Time Trial Championship, Magno Nazaret

References

External links

Cycling teams based in Brazil
Cycling teams established in 2010
2010 establishments in Brazil